The 1994–95 Women's EHF Cup was the 14th edition of the competition, running from 7 October 1994 to 7 May 1995. 1994 runner-up Debreceni VSC defeated Baekkelagets SK on away goals to become the first Hungarian club to win it. Buxtehuder SV and Slovan Duslo Sala also reached the semifinals.

Qualifying round

Round of 16

Quarter-finals

Semifinals

Final

References

Women's EHF Cup
EHF Women's Cup
EHF Women's Cup